Pak Kyong-suk (1921 – 31 August 2020) was a North Korean politician. She was a seamstress in Kim Il-sung's guerrilla forces during the 1930s. After the liberation of Korea, she held posts in the Workers' Party of Korea (WPK), Democratic Women's League, as well as being a delegate to the Supreme People's Assembly.

Career
Pak Kyong-suk was born in Eastern Manchuria in 1921. In the 1930s during the anti-Japanese struggle, she was a member of Kim Il-sung's sewing unit. Kim Il-sung remembers her as one of the best radio operators in his autobiography With the Century, writing:

Her political career began in c. 1948 when she became the director of the secret documents department of the Central Committee of the Workers' Party of Korea (WPK). In 1954 she became a member of the Central Committee of the Democratic Women's League. 

In July 1956, she became a deputy department director in the WPK South Hamhyong provincial committee. In October 1959 she became the chairwoman of the Pyongyang Paper Mill party committee. She became a candidate member of the WPK Central Committee in September 1961. In May 1963 she became the deputy director of the Light Industry and Commerce Department of the WPK Central Committee. With these qualifications, she was considered a "veteran Party cadre".

In 1962 she was elected to the Supreme People's Assembly. She renewed her seat in 1967.

She was awarded the Jubilee Medal "70 Years of Victory in the Great Patriotic War 1941–1945" on 6 May 2015 by Vladimir Putin and Jubilee Medal "75 Years of Victory in the Great Patriotic War 1941–1945" on 6 May 2020.

She was on the funeral committees of Kim Chol-man, Ri Ul-sol, and Hwang Sun-hui.

See also

 Politics of North Korea

References

Works cited
 
 

2020 deaths
1921 births
Workers' Party of Korea politicians
21st-century North Korean women politicians
21st-century North Korean politicians
20th-century North Korean women politicians
20th-century North Korean politicians
North Korean military personnel
Military personnel of the Second Sino-Japanese War
Female military personnel
Women government ministers of North Korea